Tsander is a large lunar impact crater on the far side of the Moon. Attached to the southeastern outer rim is the younger crater Kibal'chich. To the northwest lies Dirichlet, and to the northeast lies Artem'ev.

This is a heavily worn crater formation with an outer rim that has been rendered into an uneven, somewhat circular range due to impact erosion. There is a significant outward bulge along the rim edge to the south-southwest. A smaller crater lies across the rim to the west-northwest. The interior floor has low ridges and uneven areas most likely as the result of large deposits of ejecta. There is a cluster of small craters near the midpoint of the interior, and the worn remains of a pair of older impacts in the north and west.

Tsander lies to the southeast of the Dirichlet-Jackson Basin.

This crater takes its name from the Cyrillic rendering of Friedrich Zander, an early developer of rocket engines.

Satellite craters
By convention these features are identified on lunar maps by placing the letter on the side of the crater midpoint that is closest to Tsander.

References

 
 
 
 
 
 
 
 
 
 
 
 

Impact craters on the Moon